Never Never is the second book in the Harriet Blue detective series.  Harriet, always known as "Harry," Blue is a top-notch sex crimes investigator in Sydney, Australia.

Plot
When Harry's brother is arrested for the murders of three young women, her boss needs to get the mercurial Harry away "for her own good" from Sydney and a merciless press. She is assigned to a small town in Western Australia with a new partner. While she waits for her leave to be up a terrorist incident occurs, terrifying the townspeople and causing her new partners to doubt what the source is. As the tension mounts for her things get trickier until the final blow.

Reviews
The AustCrime website likes this book with some reservations. Incidentally, it was available in Australia much earlier than it was in the U.S. The review on AustCrime said, "Never Never is a paint-by-numbers thriller, one that clearly comes from the type of book factory that can turn out a number of “co-authored” novels per year. But it is enjoyable for what it is and thriller fans will be kept happy as the pages turn."

References

Novels by James Patterson
Australian crime novels
2016 American novels
Little, Brown and Company books
Novels set in Sydney
Century (imprint) books